Elizabeth A. Crowley (born October 22, 1951) is an American politician and former Democratic member of the Rhode Island Senate representing District 16 from 2009 to 2021.

Education
Crowley graduated from Salve Regina University.

Elections
2012 Crowley was challenged by former state Representative Joseph Moran in the September 11, 2012 Democratic Primary; Crowley won with 1,189 votes (67.8%), and won the November 6, 2012 General election with 4,616 votes (89.7%) against Moderate candidate Nicholas Gelfuso.
2008 Crowley challenged District 16 incumbent Senator Daniel Issa in the September 9, 2008 Democratic Primary, winning with 1,162 votes (62.4%), and won the November 4, 2008 General election with 4,575 votes (86.7%) against Republican nominee Albert Larivee.
2010 Crowley was challenged by former Senator Issa in the September 23, 2010 Democratic Primary; Crowley won with 1,084 votes (55.1%), and won the November 2, 2010 General election with 2,521 votes (75.2%) against Republican nominee Ernest Cabral, who had run for House seats in 2002 and 2004.

References

External links
Official page at the Rhode Island General Assembly

Elizabeth Crowley at Ballotpedia
Elizabeth A. Crowley at the National Institute on Money in State Politics

Place of birth missing (living people)
1951 births
Living people
People from Central Falls, Rhode Island
Democratic Party Rhode Island state senators
Salve Regina University alumni
Women state legislators in Rhode Island
21st-century American politicians
21st-century American women politicians